This is a list of prominent 20th-century wilderness explorers, naturalists, survival instructors, and exponents of outdoor education, adventure education, adventure therapy, wilderness therapy, etc.

20th-century proponents of outdoor education

See also

Conservation movement
Notable outdoor exponents in the Philippines
United States Army Indian Scouts
Lists
List of 20th-century summiters of Mount Everest
List of American guerrillas in the Philippines
List of climbers and mountaineers
List of Mount Everest summiters by number of times to the summit
List of underwater divers

Notes and references

External links
 History of Outdoor Education: Introduction
 History of Outdoor Education Research
 Historical Timeline of Outdoor Education
  Historical Development of Outdoor Education
 Books about Adventure-based Group Activities, Games, Exercises & Initiatives
 Outdoor Education Bibliographies, Reference Lists, Abstracts, Databases, & Indexes
 Camp-Related Research Bibliographies

Bibliography
 
 
 .
 .
 
 
 
 
 
 
 
 
 

Adventure
Outdoor educators
Outdoor education
Environmental education